The 2020 Wisconsin Fall General Election was held in the U.S. state of Wisconsin on November 3, 2020.  All of Wisconsin's eight seats in the United States House of Representatives were up for election, as well as sixteen seats in the Wisconsin State Senate and all 99 seats in the Wisconsin State Assembly.  Voters also chose ten electors to represent them in the Electoral College, which then participated in selecting the president of the United States.  The 2020 Fall Partisan Primary was held on August 11, 2020.

In the Fall general election, the Democratic presidential candidate, former Vice President Joe Biden, won Wisconsin's ten electoral votes, defeating incumbent President Donald Trump.  There was no change to the partisan makeup of Wisconsin's congressional delegation.  Republicans gained two seats in the Wisconsin Senate; Democrats gained two seats in the Wisconsin Assembly.

The 2020 Wisconsin Spring Election was held April 7, 2020.  This election featured a contested race for Wisconsin Supreme Court and the Presidential preference primary for both major political parties, as well as various nonpartisan local and judicial offices.  The date of this election and deadline to submit absentee ballots became a matter of controversy amid the ongoing COVID-19 pandemic in Wisconsin.  The 2020 Wisconsin Spring Primary was held February 18, 2020.

Wisconsin Democrats celebrated the results of the April election with the victory of their preferred candidate in the Wisconsin Supreme Court election, reducing the conservative majority on the court to 4–3.  The Democrats' preferred candidate also won re-election on the Wisconsin Court of Appeals.

In the Wisconsin Democratic presidential preference primary, Vice President Joe Biden won an overwhelming victory.  This was the last primary of the 2020 Democratic nominating contest before Senator Bernie Sanders suspended his 2020 campaign. In the Wisconsin Republican presidential preference primary, incumbent President Donald Trump was unopposed.  Wisconsin voters also approved an amendment to the Constitution of Wisconsin known popularly as Marsy's Law, intended to grant new rights to victims of crimes.

A special election was held on May 12, 2020, to fill the vacancy in Wisconsin's 7th congressional district. The Republican candidate won the special election, causing no change to the congressional delegation's partisan makeup. The primary for this election was held concurrent with the spring primary on February 18.

Election information

April election

Effects of the 2020 COVID-19 pandemic

In Wisconsin, a swing state with a Democratic governor and a Republican legislature, an April 7 election for a state Supreme Court seat, the federal presidential primaries for both the Democratic and Republican parties, and several other judicial and local elections went ahead as scheduled.

Due to the pandemic, at least fifteen other U.S. states cancelled or postponed scheduled elections or primaries at the time of Wisconsin's election. With Wisconsin grappling with their own pandemic, state Democratic lawmakers made several attempts to postpone their election, but were prevented by other Republican legislators. Governor Tony Evers called the Wisconsin legislature into an April 4 special session, but the Republican-controlled Assembly and Senate graveled their sessions in and out within seventeen seconds. In a joint statement afterwards, Wisconsin's state Assembly Speaker Robin Vos and Senate Majority Leader Scott Fitzgerald criticized Evers for attempting to postpone the election, for not calling a special session earlier, and for reversing his previous position on keeping the election date intact.

Early in April, Evers publicly stated that he did not believe that he could postpone the election on his own. Nevertheless, after the legislature's inaction, the governor attempted to move the election by an executive order issued on April 6. Evers' effort was, however, blocked by the Wisconsin Supreme Court. On the same day, a separate effort to extend the deadline for mailing absentee ballots was blocked by the Supreme Court of the United States. The only major concession achieved was that absentee ballots postmarked by April 7 at 8 p.m. would be accepted until April 13. However, local media outlets reported that many voters had not received their requested absentee ballots by election day or, due to social distancing, were unable to satisfy a legal requirement that they obtain a witness's signature. Three tubs of ballots from Oshkosh and Appleton were found undelivered the next day, requiring voters who had requested a ballot to come in contact with others at a polling station or forfeit their vote.

The decision by Republican lawmakers to not alter the election in the face of the pandemic, such as to a mail-only vote, was sharply criticized by the editorial board of the local Milwaukee Journal-Sentinel, which had previously endorsed the Republican former governor Scott Walker. They called the election "the most undemocratic in the state's history," adding that it put "at risk everything we've gained from the past three weeks of staying home and keeping our distance." In a sub-headline, The New York Times stated that the election was "almost certain to be tarred as illegitimate." The newspaper contextualized the inability of Wisconsin's lawmakers to come to an agreement on altering the election as another chapter in the contentious recent political history of the state, which included "a decade of bitter partisan wrangling that saw [state Republicans] clinically attack and defang the state's Democratic institutions, starting with organized labor and continuing with voting laws making it far harder for poor and black residents of urban areas to vote." Republicans believed that holding the election on April 7, when Democratic-leaning urban areas were hard-hit by the pandemic, would help secure them political advantages like a continued 5–2 conservative majority on the Wisconsin Supreme Court (through the elected seat of Daniel Kelly).

When the election went ahead on April 7, access to easy in-person voting heavily depended on where voters were located. In smaller or more rural communities, which tended to be whiter and vote Republican, few issues were reported. In more urbanized areas, the COVID-19 pandemic forced the closure and consolidation of many polling places around the state despite the use of 2,400 National Guard members to combat a severe shortage in poll workers. The effects were felt most heavily in Milwaukee, Wisconsin's most populous city with the largest minority population and the center of the state's ongoing pandemic. The city's government was only able to open 5 of 180 polling stations after being short by nearly 1,000 poll workers. As a result, lengthy lines were reported, with some voters waiting for up to 2.5 hours and through rain showers. The lines disproportionately affected Milwaukee's large Hispanic and African-American population; the latter had already been disproportionately afflicted with the COVID-19 pandemic, forming nearly half of Wisconsin's documented cases and over half its deaths at the time the vote was conducted. However, by the time the election concluded, Milwaukee Election Commissioner Neil Albrecht stated that despite some of the problems, the in-person voting ran smoothly.

Similar problems with poll station closures and long lines were reported in Waukesha, where only one polling station was opened for a city of 70,000, and Green Bay, where only 17 poll workers out of 270 were able to work. Other cities were able to keep lines much shorter, including the state capital of Madison, which opened about two-thirds of its usual polling locations, and Appleton, which opened all of its usual 15.

Voters across the state were advised to maintain social distancing, wear face masks, and bring their own pens. Vos, the state Assembly Speaker, served as an election inspector for in-person voting on April 7. While wearing medical-like personal protective equipment of gloves, a mask, and full gown, he told reporters that it was "incredibly safe to go out" and vote, adding that voters faced "minimal exposure."

Turnout
1,551,711 valid ballots were cast.

This voter turnout is approximately 45.8% of eligible voters.

Turnout was also 34.3% of the voting age population, which is a decrease compared to the 47.4% voting age population turnout of the April 2016 elections.

Mail and absentee ballots

April 2020 election
As of April 21, 2020, Wisconsin reports that 1,239,611 absentee ballots were requested by voters, 1,282,097 absentee ballots were sent to voters, and 1,138,491 absentee ballots were returned by voters for the April 7 elections. It has not been reported how many absentee ballots were valid.

Approximately 71% of votes cast in the April election were absentee ballots, an unprecedented proportion of absentee votes in Wisconsin.

After reports of missing and undelivered absentee ballots, Wisconsin's Senators Tammy Baldwin and Ron Johnson, as well as the Milwaukee Election Commission, called for investigations.

November 2020 election
To vote by mail in the November election, registered Wisconsin voters had to request a ballot by October 29, 2020. As of early October, some 1,315,431 voters had requested mail ballots.

Federal offices

President 

Incumbent President Donald Trump sought a second four-year term.  In Wisconsin, voters chose electors for Democratic former Vice President Joe Biden.

Democratic Primary 

For its part in the 2020 Democratic Party presidential primaries, Wisconsin's presidential preference primary was on the ballot for Wisconsin's spring general election, held on Tuesday, April 7, 2020.  At the time of the Wisconsin primary, only Joe Biden and Bernie Sanders remained in the field of Democratic candidates. However, due to delays in vote-counting, Bernie Sanders had already withdrawn from the race by the time the vote totals were released.  Joe Biden won a decisive victory in the state, capturing about 63% of the vote and winning every county.

The Wisconsin primary is an open primary, with the state awarding 97 delegates, of which 84 are pledged delegates allocated on the basis of the results of the primary election.

Republican Primary 

In the 2020 Republican Party presidential primaries, the Wisconsin Republican presidential preference primary was also on the April 7 ballot.  The only candidate for the Republican nomination was incumbent President Donald Trump, who received about 98% of the vote.

General election

Polling

Results
Joe Biden won the Presidential election against Donald Trump and was awarded Wisconsin's ten electoral votes.

Post-election issues

Wisconsin was one of several states where the Trump campaign sought recounts, then filed lawsuits attempting to overturn the electoral slate, then attempted to enlist allies in the State Legislature to choose an alternate slate of electors, and finally enlisted allies in Congress to attempt to throw out the state's electoral votes during the January 6, 2021, electoral vote count.  These efforts, which culminated in the January 6 riot at the United States Capitol, ultimately failed to overthrow the election results.

Senate 
Neither of Wisconsin's United States Senate seats were up for election in 2020.

House of Representatives 

The 2020 United States House of Representatives elections in Wisconsin were held on November 3, 2020, to elect Wisconsin's delegation to the United States House of Representatives for the 117th United States Congress.  A primary election for these offices was held August 11, 2020.  At the time of the 2020 election, Wisconsin had eight congressional districts, and in six districts the incumbent from the previous general election ran for and won re-election.  
 In Wisconsin's 5th congressional district, Republican Jim Sensenbrenner announced he would not seek re-election in 2020 and retired after 42 years in Congress.  His seat was won by Republican state senator Scott L. Fitzgerald.
 In Wisconsin's 7th congressional district, Republican Sean Duffy resigned his seat early due to family concerns.  A special election to fill the remainder of his term in the 116th Congress was held May 12, 2020, and was won by Republican state senator Tom Tiffany.

7th district special election
In the special election held on May 12, 2020, Republican state senator Tom Tiffany defeated Democrat Tricia Zunker.  A special primary election for the vacant congressional seat was held concurrent with the Spring Primary, February 18, 2020.  
 The winner of the Democratic primary was Tricia Zunker, president of the Wausau School Board and Associate Justice of the Ho-Chunk Nation Supreme Court.  
 The winner of the Republican primary was Tom Tiffany, state senator for Wisconsin's 12th senatorial district.

| colspan="6" style="text-align:center;background-color: #e9e9e9;"| Special Election, May 12, 2020

General election

State offices

Legislative

State Senate 

The 16 even-numbered districts out of 33 in the Wisconsin Senate were up for election in 2020.  Democrats and Republicans both had seven occupied seats and one vacant seat up in this election, for a total of eight seats each.  Seven incumbent senators have filed official papers of non-candidacy (including two vacancies).  Five candidates were running unopposed.

Prior to the election, Republicans controlled the chamber with a 18 to 13 majority.

Summary

Candidates

State Assembly 

All of the 99 seats in the Wisconsin State Assembly are up for election in 2020.  Right before this election, 63 Assembly seats were held by Republicans, 34 seats were held by Democrats, and two seats were vacant.

Summary

Candidates

Before the election, 13 incumbent Assembly members have filed papers declaring that they will not run for re-election:  11 would retire at the end of term, and two have already vacated their seats  (both seats were vacated by Democrats).  18 incumbents ran unopposed in their re-election campaigns.  Three incumbents were successfully challenged by other candidates, and lost their seats.

Judicial
Three judicial appointees of former Governor Scott Walker were defeated in the 2020 spring election—Wisconsin Supreme Court Justice Daniel Kelly, and Milwaukee Circuit Court judges Paul Dedinsky and Daniel Gabler.

State Supreme Court 

Justice Kelly was appointed to a vacant seat in 2016 by Governor Scott Walker.  Under Wisconsin law, the seat must come up for a new election for a full term on the next year when there is no other scheduled supreme court election.  Since there were supreme court elections in Wisconsin scheduled in 2017, 2018, and 2019, the election for this seat was scheduled for 2020.

Candidates
Edward A. Fallone, Marquette University law professor and candidate for Wisconsin Supreme Court in 2013
Jill Karofsky, Dane County circuit judge 
Daniel Kelly, incumbent Justice of the Wisconsin Supreme Court

Polling

Results 
While the election was formally nonpartisan, the result of the general election was regarded as a victory for the Democratic Party, as the liberal Democratic Party-backed Karofsky defeated the conservative Republican Party-backed Daniel Kelly, who also carried the endorsement of Republican Party incumbent U.S. President Donald Trump.

State Court of Appeals 
Three seats on the Wisconsin Court of Appeals were up for election in 2020.  
 Judge Joe Donald was unopposed seeking re-election in District I.
 Judge Rachel A. Graham was unopposed seeking re-election in District IV.
 In District II, incumbent Judge Lisa Neubauer defeated challenger Waukesha County Circuit Judge Paul Bugenhagen, Jr.

| colspan="6" style="text-align:center;background-color: #e9e9e9;"| General Election, April 7, 2020

State Circuit Courts 
Thirty four of the state's 249 circuit court seats were up for election in 2020.  Eight of those seats were contested.  Two incumbent judges were defeated—Milwaukee County judges Paul Dedinsky and Daniel Gabler.
 In Brown County, incumbent Judge Beau G. Liegeois, appointed by Governor Tony Evers in 2019, defeated challenger Andy Williams, a former county supervisor.
 In Chippewa County, incumbent Judge Steven R. Cray was not seeking re-election. Attorney Benjamin Lane defeated Chippewa Falls school board member Sharon Gibbs McIlquham.
 In Dodge County, incumbent Judge Steven G. Bauer was not seeking re-election.  Attorney Kristine Snow defeated assistant district attorney James Sempf.
 In Florence and Forest Counties, incumbent two-term Judge Leon D. Stenz narrowly defeated former Judge Robert A. Kennedy, Jr., who he had previously defeated in 2008.
 In Marinette County, incumbent Judge David G. Miron was not seeking re-election.  Court commissioner Jane Kopish Sequin defeated attorney Mike Perry.
 In Milwaukee County Branch 5, incumbent Judge Paul Dedinsky, appointed by Governor Scott Walker, was defeated by Brett Blomme, chairman of Milwaukee's zoning adjustment board, CEO of Cream City Foundation, and a former public defender.
 In Milwaukee County Branch 29, incumbent Daniel Gabler, appointed by Governor Scott Walker, was defeated by Rebecca Kiefer, an assistant district attorney.
 In Waukesha County, incumbent Judge Lee S. Dreyfus, Jr., was not seeking re-election.  Jack Melvin defeated Sarah A. Ponath, both are attorneys.

Constitutional Amendment
In the April election, Wisconsin voters overwhelmingly approved an amendment to the Constitution of Wisconsin to enact the Wisconsin version of Marsy's Law.  The amendment is intended to provide additional rights to victims of crimes, but the language of the Wisconsin referendum was criticized by legal experts as vague and misleading.

Local offices

Appleton
 After six-term incumbent mayor Tim Hanna announced he would not seek re-election, Appleton became the site of a contested mayoral race where Jake Woodford, a senior administrator at Appleton's Lawrence University, defeated former city council member James Clemons by a margin of a little over 10 percent. Woodford had received Mayor Hanna's endorsement in the days leading up to the election, in large part because Hanna believed Woodford was better suited to manage the COVID-19 pandemic. Woodford was also noted for his youth, as he was just 29 years old at the time of his victory.

Kenosha
 Incumbent John Antaramian was reelected to a sixth four-year term as Mayor of Kenosha.

Milwaukee
 Tom Barrett was re-elected to a fifth term as Mayor of Milwaukee, defeating state senator Lena Taylor.
 Assemblyman David Crowley narrowly defeated state senator Chris Larson to become the next County Executive of Milwaukee County.
 Attorney Tearman Spencer defeated 36-year incumbent Milwaukee City Attorney Grant F. Langley.  Spencer announced the day before the election that he had tested positive for COVID-19.

Racine
 By a margin of five votes, Racine County voters approved a referendum to allow Racine Unified School District to collect an addition $1 billion in revenue over the next 30 years to fund a long-term plan for school facilities construction and maintenance.  The local referendum received unusual national attention when it was endorsed by both leading candidates for the Democratic presidential nomination—Joe Biden and Bernie Sanders.  After a recount, the result was confirmed by a final margin of four votes. Legal challenges to the referendum results continued for more than two years, with the Wisconsin Supreme Court unanimously ruling in April 2022 that there was no right to re-examine election results in court after a recount had already been completed by the appropriate elections officials.

Wausau
 Incumbent Mayor Robert Mielke was defeated by Marathon County Supervisor Katie Rosenberg.

See also
 Voter suppression in the United States 2019–2020: Wisconsin
 Elections in Wisconsin
 Bilingual elections requirement for Wisconsin (per Voting Rights Act Amendments of 2006)
 Political party strength in Wisconsin

Notes

Partisan clients

References

Further reading

External links
Wisconsin Elections Commission
 

 
 
  (State affiliate of the U.S. League of Women Voters)
 
 . (Guidance to help voters get to the polls; addresses transport, childcare, work, information challenges)
 

 
Wisconsin
Wisconsin State Legislature elections